Shindikurbet  is a village in the southern state of Karnataka, India. It is located in the Gokak taluk of Belagavi district in Karnataka.
""Media Company"" Berojgaar News is a Monthly Magazine which advocates the voice against corruption,unemployment and terrorism.

Demographics
 India census, Shindikurbet had a population of 10752 with 5511 males and 5241 females.

See also
 Belgaum
 Districts of Karnataka

References

External links
 https://web.archive.org/web/20140517152328/http://bnnl.in/
 http://www.shindikurbet.com
 http://www.nextmarket.in
 http://Belgaum.nic.in/

Villages in Belagavi district